is a railway station on the Sanriku Railway Company’s Rias Line in the city of Miyako, Iwate Prefecture, Japan.

Lines
Seta Station is served by the Rias Line, and is located 113.5 kilometers from the terminus of the line at Sakari Station.

Station layout 
Settai Station has a single side platform serving a single bi-directional track. There is no station building, but only a rain shelter on the platform.

Adjacent stations

History 
Settai Station opened on 1 April 1984, the same day of the privatization of the Japanese National Railways (JNR) Kuji Line (which became the Sanriku Railway Company). Minami-Rias Line, a portion of Yamada Line, and Kita-Rias Line constitute Rias Line on 23 March 2019. Accordingly, this station became an intermediate station of Rias Line.

Passenger statistics
In fiscal 2015,  the station was used by 7 passengers daily.

Surrounding area 
National Route 45

See also
 List of railway stations in Japan

References

External links

  

Railway stations in Iwate Prefecture
Railway stations in Japan opened in 1984
Rias Line
Miyako, Iwate